Vegas Robaina is the name of a premium cigar brand, produced on the island of Cuba for Habanos SA, the Cuban state-owned tobacco company.

History 

Alejandro Robaina was renowned by cigar aficionados everywhere as one of the best tobacco farmers in the famed Vuelta Abajo of Cuba.  Each year, 80% of Don Alejandro's tobacco harvest was deemed fit for use as wrapper leaf for Cuban cigars (compared to only around 35% for other plantations).  In 1997, Habanos SA honored him by launching a new line of cigars bearing the name of his famous farmland.  Vegas Robaina cigars, made in Havana at the former H. Upmann factory, have quickly become popular among cigar aficionados.

Don Alejandro has, himself, become a celebrity in the world of Cuban cigars, with many aficionados and tourists in Cuba flocking to his farm in the San Luis region of the Vuelta Abajo to meet the man himself and see his tobacco, Vegas.

Don Alejandro died on April 17, 2010 after being diagnosed with cancer in 2009.

Vitolas in the Vegas Robaina Line

The following list of vitolas de salida (commercial vitolas) within the Vegas Robaina marque lists their size and ring gauge in Imperial (and Metric), their vitolas de galera (factory vitolas), and their common name in American cigar slang.

Hand-Made Vitolas
 Clásico - 6½" × 42 (165 × 16.67 mm), Cervantes, a lonsdale [discontinued]
 Don Alejandro - 7⅝" × 49 (194 × 19.45 mm), Prominente, a double corona
 Familiar - 5⅝" × 42 (143 × 16.67 mm), Corona, a corona
 Famoso - 5" × 48 (127 × 19.05 mm), Hermoso No. 4, a corona extra
 Único - 6⅛" × 52 (156 × 20.64 mm), Pirámide, a pyramid

See also 
 Cigar brands

References
 Nee, Min Ron - An Illustrated Encyclopaedia of Post-Revolution Havana Cigars (2003, Reprinted: 2005),

External links
 Official website of Habanos S.A.
 Reviews of Vegas Robaina Cigars
 Partagas Lusitanias
 A photo of Don Alejandro Robaina at his farm by Robert Frigault

Habanos S.A. brands